Mallow General Hospital is a public hospital located in Mallow, County Cork, Ireland. It is managed by South/Southwest Hospital Group.

History
The hospital has its origins in the Mallow Union Workhouse and Infirmary which was designed by George Wilkinson and opened in 1841. Following the creation of the Irish Free State the infirmary became a district hospital which evolved to become Mallow General Hospital. The administration block was rebuilt in 1936.

Services
The hospital provides 81 beds, of which 76 are in-patient acute beds, while 5 are reserved for acute day cases.

See also
 Cork University Hospital
 St. Mary's Health Campus

References

Hospitals in County Cork
Mallow, County Cork
Health Service Executive hospitals
Hospital buildings completed in 1936
1841 establishments in Ireland
Hospitals established in 1841